Constanța (or ; , or), historically known as Tomis, is a port city in the Dobruja historical region of Romania. As the country's fourth largest city and principal port on the Black Sea coast, Constanța is the capital of Constanța County. It is also the oldest continuously inhabited city in the region, founded around 600 BC, and among the oldest in Europe.

As of the 2011 census, Constanța has a population of 283,872. The Constanța metropolitan area includes 14 localities within  of the city. It is one of the largest metropolitan areas in Romania. Ethnic Romanians became a majority in the city in the early 20th century. The city still has small Tatar and Greek communities, which were substantial in previous centuries, as well as Turkish and Romani residents, among others.

It is the largest port on the Black Sea, and one of the largest ports in Europe.

Legend has it that Jason landed in Constanța with the Argonauts after finding the Golden Fleece.

History 

According to Jordanes (after Cassiodorus), the foundation of the city was ascribed to Tomyris, the queen of the Massagetae (the origin and deeds of the Goths):

In 29 BC, the Romans captured the region from the Odrysian kingdom, and annexed it as far as the Danube, under the name of Limes Scythicus ("Scythian Frontier").

In AD 8, the Roman poet Ovid (43 BC–17AD) was banished here by Emperor Augustus for the last eight years of his life. He lamented his Tomisian exile in his poems Tristia and Epistulae ex Ponto. Tomis was "by his account a town located in a war-stricken cultural wasteland on the remotest margins of the empire".

A number of inscriptions found in and around the city show that Constanța stands over the site of Tomis. Some of these finds are now preserved in the British Museum in London.

The city was afterwards included in the Province of Moesia, and, from the time of Diocletian, in Scythia Minor, of which it was the metropolis. After the 5th century, Tomis fell under the rule of the Eastern Roman Empire. During Maurice's Balkan campaigns, Tomis was besieged by the Avars in the winter of 597/598.

Tomis was later renamed to Constantiana in honour of Constantia, the half-sister of Roman Emperor Constantine the Great (274-337). The earliest known usage of this name was in 950. The city lay at the seaward end of the Great Wall of Trajan, and was surrounded by fortifications of its own.

After over 500 years as part of the Bulgarian Empire, and becoming subsequently an independent principality of Dobrotitsa/Dobrotici and of Wallachia under Mircea I of Wallachia, Constanța fell under Ottoman rule around 1419.

A railroad linking Constanța to Cernavodă was laid in 1860. In spite of damage done by railway contractors considerable remains of ancient walls, pillars, etc came to light. What is thought to have been a port building was excavated, and revealed the substantial remains of one of the longest mosaic pavements in the world.

In 1878, after the Romanian War of Independence, Constanța and the rest of Northern Dobruja were ceded by the Ottoman Empire to Romania. The city became Romania's main seaport and the transit point for much of Romania's exports.  The Constanța Casino, a historic monument and a symbol of the modern city, was the first building constructed on the shore of the Black Sea after Dobruja came under Romanian administration, with the cornerstone being laid in 1880.

On October 22, 1916 (during World War I), the Central Powers (German, Turkish and Bulgarian troops) occupied Constanța.  According to the Treaty of Bucharest of May 1918, article X.b. (a treaty never ratified by Romania), Constanța remained under the joint control of the Central Powers. The city came afterwards under Bulgarian rule after a protocol regarding the transfer of the jointly administered zone in Northern Dobruja to Bulgaria had been signed in Berlin on 24 September 1918, by Germany, Austria-Hungary, the Ottoman Empire and Bulgaria. The agreement was short-lived: five days later, on 29 September, Bulgaria capitulated after the successful offensive on the Macedonian front (see the Armistice of Salonica), and the Allied troops liberated the city in 1918.

In the interwar years, the city became Romania's main commercial hub, so that by the 1930s over half of its exports were exiting via the port. During World War II, when Romania joined the Axis powers, Constanța was a major target for the Allied bombers. While the town was left relatively unscathed, the port suffered extensive damage, recovering only in the early 1950s.

Following the 2022 Russian invasion of Ukraine,  the blockading of the Ukrainian Black Sea ports led to renewed interest in the port of Constanta as one possible outlet for transporting grain to the rest of the world.

Geography
Constanța is the administrative center of the county with the same name and the largest city in the EU Southeastern development region of Romania. Mamaia, an administrative district of Constanța, is the largest and most modern resort on the Romanian coast. Mineral springs in the surrounding area and sea bathing attract many visitors in summer.

Climate

Constanța is one of the warmest cities in Romania. It has a humid subtropical climate (Cfa), with oceanic and semi-arid influences. There are four distinct seasons during the year.

Most summer days see a gentle breeze refreshing the daytime temperatures. Nights are warm and somewhat muggy because of the heat stored by the sea.

Autumn starts in mid or late September with warm and sunny days. September can be warmer than June, owing to the warmth accumulated by the Black Sea during the summer. The first frost occurs on average in mid November.

Winter is milder than other cities in southern Romania. Snow is not abundant but the weather can be very windy and unpleasant. Winter arrives much later than inland and December weather is often mild with high temperatures reaching  - . Winter storms, which occur when the sea becomes particularly treacherous, are a common occurrence between December and March.

Spring arrives early but it is quite cool.

Four of the warmest seven years from 1889 to 2008 have occurred after the year 2000 (2000, 2001, 2007 and 2008). As of September 2009, the winter and the summer of 2007 were respectively the warmest and the second warmest in recorded history with monthly averages for January (+6.5 °C) and June (+23.0 °C) breaking all-time records. Overall, 2007 was the warmest year since 1889 when weather recording began.

Demographics 

, 283,872 inhabitants live within the city limits, a decrease from the figure recorded at the 2002 census.

, an article of INS said that the population of Constanța grew, the city having at the end of the year 319,678 inhabitants living permanently within the city limits.

After Bucharest, the capital city, Romania has a number of major cities that are roughly equal in size: Constanța, Iași, Cluj-Napoca, and Timișoara.

The metropolitan area of Constanța has a permanent population of 387,593 inhabitants, i.e. 61% of the total population of the county, and a minimum average of 120,000 per day, tourists or seasonal workers, transient people during the high tourist season.

Economy

As of 1878, Constanța was defined as a "poor Turkish fishing village." As of 1920, it was called "flourishing", and was known for exporting oil and cereals.

Constanța is one of Romania's main industrial, commercial and tourist centers. During the first half of 2008, some 3,144 new companies were established in Constanța and its neighbouring localities, a number surpassed only in Bucharest and Cluj County. The Port of Constanța is the largest on the Black Sea and the fourth largest in Europe. The city also boasts a comparably large shipyard.

Tourism has been an increasingly important economic activity in recent years. Although Constanța has been promoted as a seaside resort since the time of Carol I of Romania, the development of naval industry has had a detrimental effect on the city's beaches. However a massive rehabilitation of the beaches was undertaken in 2020 with EU funds that has resulted in new hectares of beach both in downtown Constanta and Mamaia.
Due to its proximity to other major tourist destinations, Constanța receives a significant number of visitors every year, who discover and visit the city's monuments and attractions, as well as the increasingly popular festival Neversea. Also, Constanța is a centre of commerce and education, both of which significantly contribute to the local economy.

Transport

The opening, in 1895, of the railway to Bucharest, which crosses the Danube River at the bridge at Cernavodă, brought Constanța considerable transit trade in grain and petroleum, which are largely exported; coal and coke head the list of imports, followed by machinery, iron goods, cotton and woollen fabrics.

The A2 motorway provides a rapid road link between Constanța and Bucharest, while the A4 motorway acts as the city's outer traffic ring, diverting heavy traffic to and from the Port of Constanța and to Mangalia.

The Port of Constanța includes the North Port and the South Port, and is the fourth largest in Europe. It is protected by breakwaters, with a lighthouse at the entrance. The port is sheltered from the northerly winds, but southerly winds can prove dangerous at times. The Black Sea squadron of the Romanian fleet is stationed here. A large canal (the Danube-Black Sea Canal) connects the Danube River to the Black Sea at Constanța.

The city is served by Mihail Kogălniceanu International Airport.

Constanța's public transport system is run by Regia Autonomă de Transport în Comun Constanța (RATC), and consists of 23 year-round bus lines, and one summer sightseeing double decker open top bus line to tourists.

In the early 2000s, the city bought 130 new MAZ buses to replace the aging fleet of DAC buses. The entire fleet is now made up of buses from the 2000-2008 period, which are painted in distinctive bright colors, such as pink, yellow and green. There is also a fleet of double decker Volvo buses that run in the summer, providing access to and from the resort of Mamaia. As of October 2013, the cost of a return ticket is 3 lei.

Trams were active until the late 2000s when they were decommissioned in favour of long-wheelbase buses. Two trolley bus lines were active until the early 2010s - now also decommissioned and replaced by buses.

At the end of March 2014, all public buses were upgraded with Wi-Fi for free use by all passengers. Speeds fall into the 3G HSDPA mobile range. Also, as an upgrade to the ticketing system, since the same time, tickets and per day all bus lines subscriptions can be bought via SMS, accepted by all national operators.

In July 2018 Constanța municipality signed an €18 million-contract to acquire new buses manufactured by the Turkish company Anadolu Isuzu.

There are also plenty of private minibuses (similar to a share taxi) which run along longer and more intricate lines. 

Tourism

Constanța is worth exploring for its archaeological treasures and the atmosphere of the older part of town. Its historical monuments, ancient ruins, grand but abandoned casino, museums, shops, and proximity to beach resorts make it the focal point of Romania's Black Sea coastal tourism. Open-air restaurants, nightclubs and cabarets offer a wide variety of entertainment.

Regional attractions include traditional villages, vineyards, ancient monuments and the Danube Delta, the best preserved delta in Europe.

Main sights

Ovid's Square

The Emperor Augustus exiled the Roman poet Ovid to what was then Tomis in 8 AD.  In 1887 the sculptor Ettore Ferrari designed a statue of the poet which gave its name to this square in the old town.  In 1916, during the occupation of Dobruja by the Central Powers, it was taken down by Bulgarian troops, but was later reinstated by the Germans. There is an exact replica of the statue in Sulmona, Ovid's hometown in Italy.

The statue stands in front of the National History and Archaeology Museum which is housed in the old City Hall and contains a large collection of ancient art..

Roman Mosaics (Edificiul Roman cu Mozaic)

A vast complex of late Roman buildings on three levels once linked the upper town to the harbor and marked its commercial center. Archaeological traces point to the existence of workshops, warehouses and shops in the area. Remains of the Roman public baths can be seen nearby. Roman aqueducts once brought water  to the town.

Genoese Lighthouse (Farul Genovez)

Soaring , the Genoese Lighthouse was built in 1860 by the Danubius and Black Sea Company to honor Genoese merchants who established a flourishing sea trade community here in the 13th century.

Casino (Cazinoul)

Commissioned by King Carol I in 1910 and designed by architects Daniel Renard and Petre Antonescu right on the seashore, the derelict Constanța Casino features sumptuous Art Nouveau architecture. Once a huge attraction for European tourists, the casino lost its customers after the collapse of Communism. In 2021 renovation of the building finally began. 

The Constanța Aquarium is nearby.

House with Lions (Casa cu Lei)

Blending pre-Romanesque and Genoese architectural styles, this late 19th century building features four columns adorned with imposing sculptured lions. During the 1930s, its elegant salons hosted the Constanța Masonic Lodge.

Archeology Park (Parcul Arheologic)

In the heart of Constanța, the park displays dozens of vestiges of the city's past including columns, amphorae, capitals, fragments of 3rd and 4th-century buildings, and a 6th-century tower.

National Opera and Ballet Theater Oleg Danovski
Built in 1957 to host theatre productions and operas, the state-funded Dobrogean Musical Theater hosted a multitude of shows written by some of Romania's most prolific composers and playwrights. In 1978, master choreographer Oleg Danovski formed the Classical and Contemporary Ballet Ensemble, revitalising the theater's significance. After Danovski's death in 1996, the shows slowed down, and in 2004 the theater was closed by the Culture Department of the City Council.

Cathedral of Saints Peter and Paul
Constructed in neo-Byzantine style between 1883 and 1885, the church was severely damaged during World War II and was restored in 1951. The interior murals combine neo-Byzantine style with purely Romanian elements best observed in the iconostasis and pews, chandeliers and candlesticks (bronze and brass alloy), all designed by Ion Mincu and manufactured in Paris.

Grand Mosque of Constanța (Marea Moschee din Constanța)
Built in 1910 by King Carol I, the Grand Mosque of Constanța (originally the Carol I Mosque) is the seat of the Mufti, the spiritual leader of the 55,000 Muslims (Turks and Tatars by origin) who live along the coast of the Dobrogea region. The building combines Neo-Byzantine and Romanian architectural elements, making it one of the most distinctive mosques in the area. The highlight of the interior is a large Turkish carpet, a gift from Sultan Abdülhamid II; woven at the Hereke factory in Turkey, it is one of the largest carpets in Europe, weighing 1,080 pounds. The  minaret (tower) provides views of the old part of town and the harbor. Five times a day, the muezzin climbs 140 steps to the top to call the faithful to prayer.

Hünkar Mosque (Geamia Hunchiar)

Completed in 1869, the Hünkar Mosque was commissioned by Ottoman Sultan Abdülaziz for Turks who were forced to leave Crimea after the Crimean War (1853–56) and settled in Constanța. It was restored in 1945 and 1992.

Fantasio Theatre (Teatrul Fantasio)

Originally called the Tranulis Theater after its benefactor, this theater was built in 1927 by Demostene Tranulis, a local philanthropist of Greek origin. A fine building featuring elements of neoclassical architecture, it's in the heart of the new city on Ferdinand Boulevard.

Romanian Navy Museum (Muzeul marinei române)

The largest institution of its kind in Romania, this museum showcases the development of the country's military and civil navy. The idea for the museum was outlined in 1919, but it only opened on 3 August 1969 during the regime of Nicolae Ceaușescu. The collections include models of ships, knots, anchors and navy uniforms. It has also a special collection dedicated to figures who were important to the history of the Romanian navy.

Natural Sciences Museum Complex (Complexul Muzeal de Științe ale Naturii)

The zoo-like complex consists of a dolphinarium, exotic birds exhibition, and a micro-Delta. There's a planetarium next door.

Neighborhoods

 Abator
 Anadalchioi
 Badea Cârțan
 Boreal
 Casa de Cultură
 Centru
 C.E.T.
 Coiciu
 Compozitorilor
 Dacia
 Energia
 Faleză Nord
 Faleză Sud (Poarta 6)
 Far
 Gară
 Groapă
 Halta Traian
 I.C.I.L.
 I.C. Brătianu (Filimon Sîrbu between 1948 and 1990)
 Inel I
 Inel II
 Km. 4 (Billa)
 Km. 4-5
 Km. 5
 Medeea
 Mamaia
 Palas
 Peninsulă
 Pescărie
 Piața Chiliei
 Piața Griviței
 Port
 Tăbăcărie
 Tomis I
 Tomis II
 Tomis III
 Tomis IV
 Tomis Nord
 Trocadero
 Unirii
 Victoria
 Viile Noi
 Zona Industrială

Politics

List of mayors (1990–present) 

The mayors elected since the 1989 revolution have been the following:

City Council 

The Constanța Municipal Council is made up of 27 councilors, with the following party composition:

Media

Sports
Constanța is home to several football clubs, with FCV Farul Constanța playing in the Romanian first division. There are two rugby teams in Constanța: RC Farul Constanța, who play in Divizia Națională BRD, and Constructorul Cleopatra Constanța, who play in Divizia A. One of the top Romanian handball clubs, HCD Constanța, is also based in the city. Olympic champion gymnasts Camelia Voinea, Nicoleta Daniela Sofronie, Simona Amânar and Cătălina Ponor were born in Constanța. Răzvan Florea, swimmer who won bronze medal at 2004 Summer Olympics was also born in Constanța. Former World number 1 in tennis Simona Halep is also a native of the city.

Constanța and Mamaia, the neighboring summer holiday resort, are home to the Constanța-Mamaia ETU Triathlon European Cup that was held there in 2014 and 2015 and is also planned to take place in 2016.

International relations

Twin towns – sister cities

Constanța is twinned with:

 Alexandria, Egypt
 Brest, France
 Callao, Peru
 Cartagena, Colombia
 Fort Lauderdale, United States
 Havana, Cuba
 Istanbul, Turkey
 İzmir, Turkey
 Makassar, Indonesia
 Mobile, United States
 Novorossiysk, Russia
 Odesa, Ukraine
 Rotterdam, Netherlands
 Saint Petersburg, Russia
 Santos, Brazil
 Shanghai, China
 Silivri, Turkey
 Sulmona, Italy
 Tepebaşı, Turkey
 Thessaloniki, Greece
 Trapani, Italy
 Turku, Finland
 Yokohama, Japan

Consulates

 The Consulate General of Russia
 The Consulate General of Turkey
 The Honorary Consulate of Albania
 The Honorary Consulate of Austria
 The Honorary Consulate of Cyprus
 The Honorary Consulate of Estonia
 The Honorary Consulate of Finland
 The Honorary Consulate of France
 The Honorary Consulate of Italy
 The Honorary Consulate of Kazakhstan
 The Honorary Consulate of Lebanon
 The Honorary Consulate of the Netherlands
 The Honorary Consulate of North Macedonia
 The Honorary Consulate of Norway
 The Honorary Consulate of Syria

Natives of Constanța

Education
 High schools
Carol I Economic College 
 Mircea cel Bătrân National College
 Constantin Bratescu National College
 Pontica Technical College of Constanta
 Mihai Eminescu National College
 Lucian Blaga High School
 Electrotechnics and Telecommunication High School
 George Călinescu High School
 Ovidius High School
 Decebal High School
 Traian High School
 International Computer Science High School of Constanța
 "Nicolae Rotaru" Sports High School
 Orthodox Theological Seminary
 National College of Arts "Queen Marie"
 Tomis Technical College
 Universities
 Mircea cel Bătrân Naval Academy
 Constanța Maritime University
 Ovidius University
 Andrei Șaguna University
 Tomis University
 Dimitrie Cantemir University
 International Schools
 Cambridge School of Constanța (CSC)

References

Studies
 Livia Buzoianu and Maria Barbulescu, "Tomis," in Dimitrios V. Grammenos and Elias K. Petropoulos (eds),  Ancient Greek Colonies in the Black Sea, Vol. 1 (Oxford,  Archaeopress, 2001) (BAR International Series; 1675 (1-2)), 287–336.

External links

 
 
 Constanța Seaport official site

 
Populated coastal places in Romania
Populated places in Constanța County
Localities in Northern Dobruja
Aromanian settlements in Romania
Cities in Romania
Capitals of Romanian counties
Roman towns and cities in Romania
Byzantine sites in Romania
Pontic Greeks
Greek colonies in Scythia Minor
Port cities and towns in Romania
Port cities of the Black Sea
Populated places established in the 1st millennium BC
Place names of Greek origin in Romania
Moesia Inferior